Oscar Pettersson (born 6 June 2000) is a Swedish footballer who plays for IF Brommapojkarna as a forward.

On 4 September 2020 Pettersson was loaned out to Superettan club Akropolis IF until the end of the season with the possibility for Djurgården to call him back when needed.

Honours

Club
Djurgården
Allsvenskan: 2019

References

External links 
 Djurgården profile 

2000 births
Living people
Association football forwards
Footballers from Stockholm
Swedish footballers
Sweden youth international footballers
Allsvenskan players
Djurgårdens IF Fotboll players